The name Clown wrasse may refer to either:
 Halichoeres maculipinna
or
 Coris aygula, also known as the Clown coris

Pictorial identification